Mazraeh Now (also Romanized as Mazra‘eh Now and Mazra‘eh-ye Now; also known as Marzāno) is a village in Mazraeh Now Rural District, in the Central District of Ashtian County, Markazi Province, Iran. At the 2006 census, its population was 679, in 225 families.

References 

Populated places in Ashtian County